Patrick Moran (24 May 1823 – 22 May 1895) was Vicar Apostolic of Eastern Province of Cape Colony in South Africa (1856–1869) and the first Roman Catholic Bishop of Dunedin, New Zealand (1869–1895).

Death
Moran died in Dunedin on 22 May 1895.

References

Sources

 Michael King, God's Farthest Outpost: A History of Catholics in New Zealand, Penguin Books, Auckland, 1997
 E.R. Simmons, A Brief History of the Catholic Church in New Zealand, Catholic Publication Centre, Auckland, 1978.
 E.R. Simmons, In Cruce Salus, A History of the Diocese of Auckland 1848 – 1980, Catholic Publication Centre, Auckland 1982.
 
 Catholic Hierarchy website Bishop Patrick Moran (retrieved 28 January 2011).

1823 births
1895 deaths
Alumni of St Patrick's College, Maynooth
19th-century Roman Catholic bishops in New Zealand
Roman Catholic bishops of Dunedin
Burials at Dunedin Southern Cemetery
Settlers of Otago
People educated at Castleknock College
Roman Catholic bishops of Port Elizabeth